Hætta is a  Norwegian Sami surname. Notable people with the surname include:

Aslak Hætta (1824–1854), one of the leaders of the Sami revolt in Guovdageaidnu
Barbro-Lill Hætta-Jacobsen (born 1972), Norwegian politician
Edel Hætta Eriksen (born 1921), Norwegian schoolteacher and politician
Ella Marie Hætta Isaksen (born 1998), Sami musician from Tana, Norway
Ellen Inga O. Hætta (born 1953), Norwegian Sámi politician
Lars Hætta (1834–1896), Norwegian Sami reindeer herder, prisoner, wood carver and Bible translator
Mattis Hætta (1959–2022), Norwegian Sami singer and recording artist

Sami-language surnames